Ovadia Harari (September 3, 1943, Cairo, Egypt – July 15, 2012, Israel) was an Egyptian-born Israeli aerospace engineer.  He was a two-time recipient of the Israel Defense Prize (1969 and 1975) and a recipient of the Israel Prize, the country's highest civilian honor, in 1987 for his contribution to the IAI Lavi project.

Harari was a graduate of the Technion and received an MBA from INSEAD in France.  He was influential in the development of Israel Aerospace Industries.

He died on July 15, 2012 at the age of 68 and was buried in Hod HaSharon.

References

Israeli aerospace engineers
Israel Aerospace Industries
Israel Prize in technology and engineering recipients
Israel Defense Prize recipients
Israeli people of Egyptian-Jewish descent
Egyptian emigrants to Israel
Engineers from Cairo
1943 births
2012 deaths